Lakavica is a village in the municipality of Gostivar, North Macedonia.

Demographics
As of the 2021 census, Lakavica had 522 residents with the following ethnic composition:
Albanians 507
Persons for whom data are taken from administrative sources 14
Others 1

According to the 2002 census, the village had a total of 994 inhabitants. Ethnic groups in the village include:

Albanians 990
Others 4

References

External links

Villages in Gostivar Municipality
Albanian communities in North Macedonia